Mark Shivas (24 April 1938 – 11 October 2008) was a British television producer, film producer and executive.

Shivas was born in Banstead in Surrey. His father was an English teacher; his mother was a librarian. He attended Whitgift School in Croydon and read law at Merton College, Oxford.<ref> "Mark Shivas], The Stage, 4 November 2012</ref> Shivas wrote for the student magazine Oxford Opinions. After abandoning a legal career, he co-founded the magazine Movie (1961–64) which used the French publication  Cahiers du Cinéma as its model,. He was assistant editor (1962–64), and also contributed interviews and articles to The New York Times.

He began his television career at Granada Television in 1964 as an assistant to the head of the story department and later worked on the company's Cinema series as a producer and presenter. In 1969 he joined the BBC's drama department, and became one of the corporation's most successful and prolific producers. The costume drama The Six Wives of Henry VIII (1970),  was nominated for three Emmy Awards in 1972. Dennis Potter's Casanova (1971) was another success.

Other productions he oversaw included the anthology series Black and Blue (1973), which included the play Secrets by Michael Palin and Terry Jones.  Critics disliked Shivas's production of The Borgias (1981) for the BBC; it suffered in comparison with the contemporary Brideshead Revisited on ITV.

Shivas was head of drama at the BBC from 1988 to 1993; he then moved to the BBC Films, and was executive producer of twenty films. In later years, he returned to producing as a freelancer. Some of his most noted later productions included the second series of Alan Bennett's Talking Heads monologues in 1998 and the 2003 espionage drama Cambridge Spies''.

Death
Shivas died from lung cancer on
11 October 2008, aged 70.

References

External links

CV at pfd.co.uk
A BAFTA Tribute to Mark Shivas, filmed BAFTA event, March 2009

1938 births
2008 deaths
Alumni of Merton College, Oxford
BBC executives
BBC television producers
People educated at Whitgift School